LNER Class Y11 was a class of petrol powered 0-4-0 locomotives built by Motor Rail & Tram Car Company Limited under their Simplex brand and introduced in the years 1919–1925, operating after its formation in 1922 on the London and North Eastern Railway (LNER).  Their British Railways numbers were 15097-15099. It was known as LNER Z6 before 1943.

Numbering 
 Works no. 1931, LNER no. 8430, re-numbered 8188, BR no. 15098 or 68188
 Built 1919, acquired by LNER 1923 (ex-Great Eastern Railway), withdrawn in 1956
 Works no. 2037, LNER no. 8431, re-numbered 8189, BR no. 15099 or 68189
 Built 1921, acquired by LNER 1923 (ex-North British Railway), withdrawn in 1956
 Works no. 2126, LNER no. ED/L4, BR no. 15097
 Unknown built date  acquired by LNER 1925 (ex-Preston Water Works, Lancashire), withdrawn in 1950
 The RCTS document BRITISH RAILWAYS, NORTH EASTERN REGION, LOCOMOTIVE ALLOCATION, 6th May 1950 records this locomotive as working at West Hartlepool (Creosote Works).

Specification

Wheel arrangement: 0-4-0
Weight: 8 tons 0 cwt
Wheel diameter: 3 ft 1in
Min curve negotiable: 1 chain
Engine type: Dorman 4JO (petrol)
Engine output: 40 hp
Power at rail: 24 hp
Maximum speed: 7½ mph
Brake type: Air on loco, no train brake
Route Availability: 1
Heating type: Not fitted
Multiple coupling type: Not fitted
Transmission: Mechanical, 2-speed Dixon Abbot

Preservation

None of the LNER Class Y11 locomotives has been preserved but several similar ones have, including:

 Works no. 2029 at the East Anglian Railway Museum
 Works no. 2028 at the Nottingham Transport Heritage Centre

Nottingham Transport Heritage Centre also has another Simplex numbered 15100.  This is probably an "imaginary" British Railways number, continuing from 15099.

External links

 LNER Encyclopedia
 East Anglian Railway Museum
 Nottingham Transport Heritage Centre

Y11
B locomotives
Railway locomotives introduced in 1919
Scrapped locomotives
Standard gauge locomotives of Great Britain
Petrol locomotives
Shunting locomotives